The Grey Magpie (German:Die graue Elster) is a 1920 German silent mystery film directed by Max Obal and starring Ernst Reicher as the detective Stuart Webbs, part of a long-running series featuring the character.

Cast
In alphabetical order
 Paul Bergson as Dr. Maxen  
 Anneliese Halbe as Frau Birnsen  
 Grete Jakobsen as Setty, genannt 'die graue Elster'  
 H. Link as Bankdirektor Birnsen  
 Ernst Reicher as Stuart Webbs  
 Robert Stöckel as Briks

References

Bibliography
 Rainey, Buck. Serials and Series: A World Filmography, 1912-1956. McFarland, 2015.

External links

1920 films
Films of the Weimar Republic
Films directed by Max Obal
German silent feature films
German mystery films
German black-and-white films
1920 mystery films
Silent mystery films
1920s German films